John William Pilbean Goffage MBE (26 March 190927 May 1971), known professionally as Chips Rafferty, was an Australian actor. Called "the living symbol of the typical Australian", Rafferty's career stretched from the late 1930s until his death in 1971, and during this time he performed regularly in major Australian feature films as well as appearing in British and American productions, including The Overlanders and The Sundowners. He appeared in commercials in Britain during the late 1950s, encouraging British emigration to Australia.

Early days
He was born John William Pilbean Goffage in Broken Hill, New South Wales to John Goffage, an English-born stock agent, and Australian-born Violet Maude Joyce. Gaining the nickname "Chips" as a school boy, Rafferty studied at Parramatta Commercial School before working in a variety of jobs, including opal miner, sheep shearer, drover, RAAF Officer and pearl diver.

Film career
He made his film debut in the comedy Ants in His Pants in 1938, as an extra, produced by Ken G. Hall. At that time, he was managing a wine cellar in Bond Street, Sydney. Rafferty caught the acting bug and got another unbilled role, as one of several inept firemen in Hall's Dad Rudd, M.P. (1940).

Forty Thousand Horsemen
Rafferty leapt to international fame when cast as one of the three leads in Forty Thousand Horsemen (1940), a film directed by Charles Chauvel that focused on the Battle of Beersheba in 1917. Rafferty had been cast after a screen test. Chauvel described him as "a cross between Slim Summerville and James Stewart, and has a variety of droll yet natural humour." He played a laconic tall bushman. Forty Thousand Horsemen was enormously popular and was screened throughout the world, becoming one of the most-seen Australian films made to that point. Although the film's romantic leads were Grant Taylor (actor) and Betty Bryant, Rafferty's performance received much acclaim.

War service
Rafferty married Ellen Kathleen "Quentin" Jameson on 28 May 1941. He enlisted in the Royal Australian Air Force the next day and entertained troops.

During the war, Rafferty was allowed to make films on leave. He appeared in a short featurette, South West Pacific (1943), directed by Hall. He was reunited with Chauvel and Grant Taylor in The Rats of Tobruk (1944), an attempt to repeat the success of Forty Thousand Horsemen.

Rafferty was discharged on 13 February 1945, having reached the rank of Flying Officer.

International fame
Ealing Studios were interested in making a feature film in Australia after the war, and assigned Harry Watt to find a subject. He came up with The Overlanders (1946), a story of a cattle drive during war time (based on a true story) and gave the lead role to Rafferty who Watt called an "Australian Gary Cooper." 

Rafferty's fee was £25 a week. Ealing Studios were so pleased they signed Rafferty to a long-term contract even before the film was released. The film was a critical and commercial success and Rafferty was established as a film star.

Ealing Studios were associated with Rank Films, who cast Rafferty in the lead of Bush Christmas (1947), a children's movie where Rafferty played the villain. It was very popular.

Ealing Studios signed Rafferty to a long-term contract. He went to England to promote The Overlanders and Ealing put him in The Loves of Joanna Godden. While promoting the film in Hollywood he met Hedda Hopper who said Rafferty "created quite a stir. They call him the Australian Gary Cooper, but if he were cut down a bit he would be more like the late Will Rogers. I don't know how they'll get him on the screen unless they do it horizontally... He is as natural as an old shoe."

Ealing and Watt wanted to make another film in Australia and decided on a spectacle, Eureka Stockade. Rafferty was cast in the lead as Peter Lalor, the head of the rebellion, despite pressures in some quarters to cast Peter Finch. The result was a box office disappointment and Rafferty's performance was much criticised.

Rafferty was meant to follow this with a comedy for Ealing co-starring Tommy Trinder. Instead, Ealing put the two actors in a drama about aboriginal land rights Bitter Springs (1950). The film was not widely popular and Ealing wound up their filmmaking operation in Australia.

Rafferty kept busy as an actor, appearing on radio in a show Chips: Story of an Outback. He was cast by 20th Century Fox in a melodrama they shot in Australia, Kangaroo (1952). The studio liked his performance enough that they flew him (and Charles Tingwell) over to Los Angeles to play Australian soldiers in The Desert Rats (1953), a war movie.

Producer
Film production in Australia had slowed to a trickle and Rafferty decided to move into movie production. He wanted to make The Green Opal, a story about immigration but could not get finance. However he then teamed up with a producer-director Lee Robinson and they decided to make movies together.

Their first movie was The Phantom Stockman (1953), directed by Robinson and starring Rafferty, and produced by them both. The film was profitable. It was followed by King of the Coral Sea, which was even more popular, and introduce Rod Taylor to cinema audiences. Rafferty and Robinson attracted the interest of the French, collaborated with them on the New Guinea adventure tale, Walk Into Paradise (1956). This was their most popular movie to date.

Rafferty also appeared as an actor only in a British-financed comedy set in Australia, Smiley (1956). It was successful and led to a sequel, Smiley Gets a Gun (1958),in which Rafferty reprised his role. In England he appeared in The Flaming Sword (1958).

He also participated in cinema advertisements that were part of an Australian Government campaign in 1957 called "Bring out a Briton". The campaign was launched in a bid to increase the number of British migrants settling in Australia.

Rafferty and Robinson raised money for three more movies with Robinson. He elected not to appear in the fourth film he produced with Robinson, Dust in the Sun (1958), their first flop together. Nor was he in The Stowaway (1959) and The Restless and the Damned (1960). All three films lost money and Rafferty found himself in financial difficulty.

Later career
Rafferty returned to being an actor only. He had a small role in The Sundowners (1960), with Robert Mitchum and Deborah Kerr and played a coastwatcher in The Wackiest Ship in the Army (1960) with Jack Lemmon and Ricky Nelson. He guest starred in several episodes of the Australian-shot TV series Whiplash (1961).

Rafferty was cast as one of the mutineers in the 1962 remake of Metro-Goldwyn-Mayer's Mutiny on the Bounty, starring Marlon Brando. The filming of Bounty in Tahiti dragged longer than six months but it restored him to financial health after the failure of his production company; it enabled him to buy a block of flats which supported him for the rest of his life. Rafferty dubbed the film The Bounteous Mutiny.

In 1962, the 6 foot 5 inch actor was socialising with fellow expatriates in a London club when they were joined by an Australian who acted as doorman, and unbeknownst to Rafferty, was a professional wrestler. Claiming he was being ignored after helping them get in the doorman was so argumentative that Rafferty was provoked into accepting a challenge to 'step outside'. In the severe beating that followed he sustained deep grazing across his face and suffered a myocardial infarction (he had not been aware of having a heart condition until the incident) costing him the chance at roles in two major film productions.

In 1963 he recorded a long play record with Festival Records (FL-31015) entitled A man and his horse, narrating a selection of works from Australian verse composers including Banjo Paterson (1864–1941), Adam Lindsay Gordon (1833–1870) and Will H. Ogilvie (1869–1963).

He played the Australian Prime Minister in the Australian sci-fi TV series The Stranger (1964) then travelled to England and appeared in eight episodes of Emergency-Ward 10 (1964). While in England he was in The Winds of Green Monday (1965) on British TV.

He travelled to the US and guest starred in episodes of The Wackiest Ship in the Army (1965) (as a different character to the role that he played in the movie version). This led to further offers to work in Hollywood on television shows; he played a Union soldier in The Big Valley (1966) with a noticeably Australian accent. He was also in episodes of Gunsmoke (1966) and Daktari (1966). "What else can I do but look to America for my future when there is still no assistance or help from the government," said in April 1966.

Back in Australia Rafferty had a good part in the Australian-shot comedy They're a Weird Mob (1966) a big local success. He returned to Hollywood to appear in episodes of The Girl from UNCLE (1967), Tarzan (1967) and The Monkees, as well as the Elvis Presley movie Double Trouble (1967) and the adventure tale Kona Coast (1968)

Returning to Australia he guest-starred in Skippy the Bush Kangaroo, Adventures of the Seaspray (1967), Rita and Wally (1968), Woobinda, Animal Doctor (1970) and Dead Men Running (1971). He continued to make films such as Skullduggery (1970).

Rafferty's final film role was in 1971's Wake in Fright, where he played an outback policeman. (The movie was filmed mainly in and around Rafferty's home town of Broken Hill.) In a review of the film, a critic praised Rafferty's performance, writing that he "exudes an unnerving intensity with a deceptively menacing and disturbing performance that ranks among the best of his career".

His final performance was in an episode of the Australian war series Spyforce (1971).

Hours before he died, Rafferty was offered a prominent role in a film The Day the Clown Cried by Jerry Lewis which was never completed or released.

Death
On 27 May 1971, Rafferty collapsed and died of a heart attack at the age of 62, while walking down a Sydney street shortly after completing his role in Wake in Fright. His wife Quentin had predeceased him in 1964 and they had no children. His remains were cremated. His ashes were scattered into his favourite fishing hole in Lovett Bay.

Honours
In the 1971 New Years' Honours, Rafferty was made a Member of the Order of British Empire (MBE) by Queen Elizabeth II for his services to the performing arts.

Australia Post issued a stamp in 1989 that depicted Rafferty in recognition of his work in Australian cinema, and in March 2006, Broken Hill City Council announced that the town's Entertainment Centre would be named in honour of Rafferty.

The Oxford Companion to Australian Film refers to Rafferty as "Australia's most prominent and significant actor of the 1940s–60s".

Australian singer/songwriter Richard Davies wrote a song, "Chips Rafferty" for his album, There's Never Been A Crowd Like This.

Associations
He was also a talented artist, and as "Long John Goffage" was a leading light of the Black and White Artists' Club. He was a Freemason.

Filmography

Unmade projects
Rafferty tried to make the following projects but was unsuccessful:
Pepper Trees – comedy from Ealing about two immigrants, co-starring Tommy Trinder and Gordon Jackson, written and directed by Ralph Smart
The Green Opal – a £60,000 film about immigration he tried to make in 1951
Return of the Boomerang (1969) directed by Philip Leacock
In 1961 MGM announced they would use Rafferty in How the West Was Won and Chautauqua.

References

External links
 
 Chips Rafferty at Australian Screen Online
 Chips Rafferty at Australian Dictionary of Biography
 Chips Rafferty at the Australian War Memorial
 Chips Rafferty Interview on Radio National
Chips Rafferty at the National Film and Sound Archive
 It's an Honour

1909 births
1971 deaths
Australian male film actors
Royal Australian Air Force officers
Male actors from New South Wales
People from Broken Hill, New South Wales
20th-century Australian male actors
Members of the Order of the British Empire